Doyle is an American horror punk band formed from Gorgeous Frankenstein in 2012 by ex-Misfits lead guitarist Doyle Wolfgang von Frankenstein and Cancerslug frontman Alex Story who also sang in Gorgeous Frankenstein. Their debut album Abominator was released in 2013 through Monsterman Records, Doyle's own label.

History 

After having formed his own band Gorgeous Frankenstein in 2005 and releasing an eponymous album on Glenn Danzig's record label Evilive, Doyle Wolfgang von Frankenstein had to deal with many lineup changes that finally led him to start over with a new project.

In agreement with Alex Story (the last vocalist of Gorgeous Frankenstein), Doyle's new project was eponymously named "Doyle". Along with these two founding members, the group's first lineup included drummer Dr. Chud (ex-Misfits) and bassist 'Left Hand' Graham (ex-Graves and Gorgeous Frankenstein).

In 2014, Dr. Chud left the band shortly before Doyle's first "Annihilate America Tour" and was replaced by Anthony "Tiny" Biuso (former drummer of T.S.O.L., The Dickies and Hed (pe)) in August.

Shortly after, "Tiny" stated that he would no longer be playing with the band, and would not continue on the remainder of the tour. He was replaced by drummer Brandon Pertzborn (Black Flag 2014–2016) just before hitting the road for the "Abominator Tour 2015" in March.

In March and April 2015, the band toured as an opening act (with Dope) for Mushroomhead, with headlining dates continuing after into May. During this tour, bassist 'Left Hand' Graham was replaced by DieTrich Thrall. The current bassist is Brandon Strate (who also plays with They Live).

The "Abominator Tour 2015" was dubbed the "Mad Monster tour" from September through October 2015 with special guest guitarist John 5 (Rob Zombie, ex-Marilyn Manson) who joined Doyle for a number of dates. For certain shows, the tour also featured the Family Ruin, Hatchet and Calabrese.

Doyle announced an upcoming album entitled As We Die for May 2017.

In February 2017, the "Abominate the World Tour" was launched in Europe ("Abominator UK/European Invasion Tour") in support of the album Abominator.

Abominator (2013) 

In 2013, Doyle's debut album, Abominator was first released digitally through INgrooves/Fontana on July 30. It was available on iTunes, Google Play, Deezer and others.

The album is distributed by Altavoz (U.S.), Nippon Columbia (Japan) and Cargo Records (Europe). It was independently produced and released by Doyle's own Monsterman Records and officially released on CD in October 2013. An "advance copy" was sold at the concerts on the "Danzig Legacy Tour", as well as from Doyle's official website. This pre-released "advance" album is lacking a 13th track, released on the final cut, entitled "Drawing Down the Moon".

The tour scheduled in support of the album had to be delayed since Doyle Wolfgang von Frankenstein was touring that year with Danzig. In 2014, the band had to cancel their tour with Gwar after the death of lead vocalist Dave Brockie.

The lyrics of Abominator were written by Alex Story and all the music and arrangements are written by Doyle Wolfgang von Frankenstein. The bass tracks for the album were played by Doyle himself.

Performing style and musical instruments 

When performing live, both Doyle Wolfgang von Frankenstein and Alex Story look like monsters from a vintage horror movie. Doyle remains faithful to his usual "Frankenstein's monster" look and make-up, wearing his classic Misfits devilock hairstyle, armbands with the band's skull logo (instead of the Misfits "Crimson Ghost") and a custom guitar strap with the inscription "Beast Mode" on the left shoulder.

As Alex Story describes it:
When he puts that [stage makeup] on, that's like warpaint or something. It's like he's going into battle. He literally transforms himself. [...] He just seem[s] like an animal, like a monster.

In the same way, Story (aka "The Wolfman") wears large sideburns and he often disguises himself as a werewolf inspired by the 1940s movie The Wolf Man.

Doyle Wolfgang von Frankenstein appears on stage with his famous black sharp edged custom "Annihilator" guitar (Oktober Guitars). Former bassist "Left Hand" Graham also played an Oktober custom "Devilwing" bass guitar with a similar design.

Members

Current 

 Doyle Wolfgang von Frankenstein – guitars (2012–present)
 Alex "Wolfman" Story – lead vocals (2012–present)
 Brandon Strate – bass, backing vocals (2015–present)
 Wade Murff – drums (2017–present)

Past 
 "Left Hand" Graham (Graham Reaper) – bass (2012–2015)
 DieTrich Thrall – bass (touring, 2015)
 The Abominable Dr. Chud – drums (2012–2014)
 Anthony "Tiny" Biuso – drums (2014–2015)
 Brandon Pertzborn – drums (2015–2017)

Discography

Albums 
  Abominator (2013)
 Doyle II: As We Die (2017)

Singles 
 "Valley of Shadows", 2013

Videos 
"As We Die", official music video, 2017
 "Valley of Shadows", official lyric video, 2013

References

External links 
 
 
 Doyle discography at Discogs

2012 establishments in New Jersey
Heavy metal musical groups from New Jersey
Horror punk groups
Musical groups established in 2012
Musical groups from New Jersey
Musical quartets